Porana is a genus of flowering plants belonging to the family Convolvulaceae.

Its native range is Indo-China to Malesia, Mexico.

Species:

Porana nutans 
Porana volubilis

References

Convolvulaceae
Convolvulaceae genera
Taxa named by Nicolaas Laurens Burman